"Maria Maria" is a song by American rock band Santana featuring the Product G&B, included on Santana's 18th studio album, Supernatural (1999). The song was written by Wyclef Jean, Jerry "Wonda" Duplessis, Carlos Santana, Karl Perazzo, and Raul Rekow while Jean and Duplessis produced it. The track samples the drum beat from "God Make Me Funky" by American jazz fusion band the Headhunters, and the melody riff was inspired by the Wu-Tang Clan song "Wu-Tang Clan Ain't Nuthing ta Fuck Wit". Interspersed with guitars and other strings, "Maria Maria" is driven by a hip hop beat. At the 2000 Grammy Awards, the song won for Best Pop Performance by a Duo or Group with Vocals, before it experienced commercial success.

"Maria Maria" was released on September 14, 1999, to American urban radio and was issued across the world throughout the following year. It reached number one in Canada, France, Germany, Hungary, Sweden, Switzerland, and the United States. In the US, it stayed at the top of the Billboard Hot 100 for 10 weeks and reached number one on two other Billboard listings. In 2009, it was named the 14th-most-successful song from 2000 to 2009 on the Billboard Hot 100 Songs of the Decade. Nine years later, in honor of the 60th anniversary of the Hot 100 chart, Billboard compiled its list of the top songs since the inception of the chart in various categories; "Maria Maria" came in at number 122 on this ranking.

Background
"Maria Maria" was written by Wyclef Jean, Jerry "Wonda" Duplessis, Carlos Santana, Karl Perazzo, and Raul Rekow. Jean and Duplessis conceived the song with Carlos Santana while Jean's previous musical group, Fugees, was on tour in San Francisco. During a Drink Champs podcast interview, Jean said that he came up with the song's composition by reworking by a 1993 Wu-Tang Clan song titled "Wu-Tang Clan Ain't Nuthing ta Fuck Wit", borrowing the instrumental that plays during the title lyrics. The track also samples the drum beat from the Headhunters' song "God Make Me Funky" from their 1975 debut album, Survival of the Fittest. Jean asked the Product G&B, a musical duo composed of Marvin Moore and David McRae, to sing on the track after the two had telephoned a nearby music studio in New York to speak to a friend. Rapper and Fugees member Pras Michel answered the call, at which point Moore and McRae immediately decided to meet him at the studio. Jean soon added the duo to his record label, Yclef.

Composition
Jean and Duplessis produced "Maria Maria" while the Product G&B provide the lead vocals. Musically, "Maria Maria" is a hip hop song with Latin influences, punctuated by Spanish guitars during the verses and Carlos Santana's electric guitar during the post-choruses, climaxing at the bridge. Tom Breihan of online publication Stereogum called the recording a "rap song [...] with no actual rapping". The lyrics of the song describe a woman named Maria who observes the tumultuous circumstances of the world around her and wishes for more pleasurable existence. Carlos Santana sings additional vocals, performing the "Ahora vengo mama chula" chants, as does Jean, who came up with his intermittent lyrics by freestyling. Duplessis plays the bass guitar while he and Jean collaborated on the drum programming. Additional instrumentalists who contributed to the recording include Jeremy Cohen on violin, Daniel Seidenberg and Hari Balakrishnan on viola, and Joseph Hébert on cello. The track was mixed, engineered, and mastered at three studios in New York City and at Fantasy Studios in Berkeley, California.

Release
"Maria Maria" first appeared as the seventh track on Supernatural, which was released in the United States on June 15, 1999. Three months later, Arista Records serviced the song to US rhythmic contemporary and urban radio on September 14, 1999, three weeks after previous single "Put Your Lights On" was sent to rock-oriented radio. Contemporary hit radio officially added "Maria Maria" to its playlists on November 23, 1999. On January 25, 2000, the song was issued in the US as a CD single, a maxi-CD single, a cassette single, and a 7-inch vinyl single. The CD and cassette contain a remix of "Maria Maria" by Jean plus "Migra", the eighth track on Supernatural. The maxi-CD includes additional remixes while the 7-inch single has the album's lead single, "Smooth", as its B-side.

In Europe, a two-track CD single and a maxi-CD were distributed, with the latter format issued on February 7, 2000. Both formats contain various mixes and instrumentals of "Maria Maria". The maxi-CD was also issued in Australia. In the United Kingdom, the single was due to be released in late June 2000 to coincide with Santana's tour there, but it was delayed several times. It was eventually issued on July 24 as a CD and cassette containing the radio mix of the track plus Jean's remix and the Pumpin' Dolls remix.

Critical reception
On October 23, 1999, Billboard reviewed the song, preferring the original version over the Wyclef remix and writing that it "sounds cooler than an autumn breeze on the airwaves", noting that its simplistic nature does not detract from the quality and pointing out that its classic yet modern sound works well. British columnist James Masterton referred to the track as a "perfect summertime soundtrack" and called Jean's contributions to the track "unmistakable". In February 2000, before the song became a commercial success, it won a Grammy Award for Best Pop Performance by a Duo or Group with Vocals, one of the eight awards Santana accrued for that night. Ultimate Santana wrote that the song's drum loop is montonous and called the electric guitar riffs messy, noting that "Maria Maria" would have been a "royal mess" had another team handled production, but went on to describe the song as "charming" and "infectious" with nicely performed vocals. In August 2022, Breihan reviewed the single for his "The Number Ones" column, giving the track a grade of 6 out of 10. He wrote that the song's beat and chants are the most engrossing parts of the composition, but the track does not live up to expectations, concluding, "It ultimately sounds like little more than a brand extension for all the parties involved, and that's really what it was."

Commercial performance
On the Billboard Hot 100, "Maria Maria" debuted at number 15 on the chart dated February 12, 2000, becoming that week's highest debut with 55,000 sales. The following week, the song jumped to number eight, giving Santana two simultaneous top-10 hits, along with "Smooth", which was at number five. After rising above "Smooth" on February 26, the song took five more issues to reach number one, garnering 102,500 weekly sales on April 8. It topped the chart for 10 weeks, dropping to number eight on June 17, and stayed on the Hot 100 for 26 weeks in total. On other Billboard rankings, the song reached number one on the Maxi-Singles Sales chart for four weeks and on the Hot R&B/Hip-Hop Singles & Tracks chart for three weeks. It also peaked at number two on the Mainstream Top 40, number seven on the Rhythmic listing, and number 12 on the Adult Top 40. At the end of 2000, Billboard ranked the song at three on its year-end edition, and in 2009, the same publication placed the track at number 14 on its decade-end ranking. In 2018, the Hot 100 published an all-time chart for its 60th anniversary, on which "Maria Maria" appeared at number 122. The Recording Industry Association of America (RIAA) awarded the song a platinum disc in March 2000, denoting shipments of one million units.

In Canada, "Maria Maria" peaked atop the RPM 100 Hit Tracks chart on April 17, 2000, and also appeared on the Adult Contemporary Tracks and Top 30 Dance rankings. In Europe, "Maria Maria" was the second-best-selling single of 2000, topping the Eurochart Hot 100. The song stayed at number one in Switzerland for five weeks, earned a platinum certification from the International Federation of the Phonographic Industry (IFPI), and came in at number two on the country's year-end chart for 2000. In Sweden, the single reached number one for two weeks, while in both France and Germany, it remained atop the charts for four weeks. It also reached number one in Hungary in March 2000. Elsewhere in continental Europe, the song entered the top 10 in nine other nations, including Austria, Denmark, Iceland, the Netherlands, and Belgium's Wallonia region, where it entered the top three. In the Czech Republic and Spain, the single achieved top-20 placings. In July 2000, the song debuted and peaked at number six on the UK Singles Chart and at number 21 on the Irish Singles Chart. The song also charted in Australia and New Zealand, topping off at number 49 in both countries and spending two non-consecutive weeks within the top 50 on both national charts.

Music video
The video starts zooming onto Carlos Santana and the Product G&B as they are performing outdoors to a group of people partying. Cut scenes include Santana playing the guitar. The focus is then put on a girl the viewers may assume is Maria. She is looking in the mirror and later joins the party. In January 2000, MTV and BET added the video to their playlists.

Legacy
"Maria Maria" became such a success that Carlos Santana worked together with chef Roberto Santibañez and California business Dudum Sports and Entertainment to open a restaurant chain named after the song. The menu, created by Santibañez, contains tradition Mexican food with alterations, containing meals such as mushroom fajitas, coconut ceviche, and guacamole made from seafood. Only four of these restaurants are operational, with two in northern California, one in Arizona, and one in Texas. Five artists were recruited to design the restaurants' decor.

In 2017, "Maria Maria" was sampled by DJ Khaled on his song "Wild Thoughts", which features Rihanna and Bryson Tiller. This single reached the top 10 in many countries, peaking at number one on the UK Singles Chart.

Track listings

US CD and cassette single
 "Maria Maria" – 4:21
 "Maria Maria" (Wyclef remix) – 4:21
 "Migra" – 5:54

US maxi-CD single
 "Maria Maria" (album version) – 4:21
 "Maria Maria" (Wyclef remix) – 4:21
 "Maria Maria" (Pumpin' Dolls radio edit) – 3:56
 "Maria Maria" (Pumpin' Dolls club mix) – 8:36
 "Maria Maria" (Wyclef Remix instrumental) – 4:21
 "Migra" (album version) – 5:54

US 7-inch single
 "Maria Maria" – 4:21
 "Smooth" (featuring Rob Thomas)

UK CD and cassette single
 "Maria Maria" (radio mix) – 4:21
 "Maria Maria" (Wyclef remix) – 4:21
 "Maria Maria" (Pumpin' Dolls remix) – 3:56

European CD single
 "Maria Maria" (radio mix) – 4:21
 "Maria Maria" (Pumpin' Dolls club mix) – 8:36

European maxi-CD and Australian CD single
 "Maria Maria" (radio mix) – 4:21
 "Maria Maria" (Pumpin' Dolls radio edit) – 3:56
 "Maria Maria" (Wyclef remix) – 4:21
 "Maria Maria" (Pumpin' Dolls club mix) – 8:36
 "Maria Maria" (Wyclef remix instrumental) – 4:21
 "Maria Maria" (Pumpin' Dolls club mix instrumental) – 8:36

Credits and personnel
Credits are taken from the Supernatural booklet and Stereogum.

Studios
 Mixed at The Hit Factory (New York City)
 Engineered at The Hit Factory (New York City) and Fantasy Studios (Berkeley, California, US)
 Mastered at Sterling Sound (New York City)

Personnel

 Wyclef Jean – writing, drum programming, production
 Jerry "Wonda" Duplessis – writing, bass, drum programming, production
 Carlos Santana – writing, additional vocals, guitar
 Karl Perazzo – writing
 Raul Rekow – writing
 The Product G&B – lead vocals
 Joseph Hébert – cello
 Daniel Seidenberg – viola
 Hari Balakrishnan – viola
 Jeremy Cohen – violin
 Andy Grassi – mixing, engineering
 Michael McCoy – mixing assistant
 Chris Theis – engineering
 Steve Fontano – engineering
 Chuck Bailey – engineering assistant
 Jason Groucott – engineering assistant
 Ted Jensen – mastering

Charts

Weekly charts

Year-end charts

Decade-end charts

All-time charts

Certifications

Release history

References

1999 singles
1999 songs
Billboard Hot 100 number-one singles
European Hot 100 Singles number-one singles
Music videos directed by Marcus Raboy
Number-one singles in Germany
Number-one singles in Hungary
Number-one singles in Sweden
Number-one singles in Switzerland
RPM Top Singles number-one singles
Santana (band) songs
SNEP Top Singles number-one singles
Song recordings produced by Jerry Duplessis
Song recordings produced by Wyclef Jean
Songs written by Carlos Santana
Songs written by Jerry Duplessis
Songs written by Wyclef Jean
Wyclef Jean songs